Aalborg Shipyard (Danish: Aalborg Værft A/S) was a shipyard located in Aalborg, Denmark.

Founded in 1912 by brothers Immanuel Stuhr and Peter Philip Stuhr, the shipyard was founded under the name Stuhr Engine and Ship Construction, a development of their father's business. From 1937 until the yard closed in 1988, it was owned by J. Lauritzen A/S.

Ships built at Aalborg Shipyard

Closure
In 1988, the company was split into five separate companies:

Danyard Aalborg, part of Royal Denship
Aalborg steelworks
Aalborg Industries (Boilers)
Norks Industrial Services (NIS)
Danish Railway Club (Limfjord path).

In 2005 the former yard area was cleared, the only building surviving demolition the 1912 machine shop, while the dry dock continues yacht production, leased by Danyard Aalborg. Today, the former yard is covered with new home and office developments.

References

History of Aalborg
Companies based in Aalborg
Shipyards of Denmark
Danish companies established in 1912